Known by a variety of names over its 101-year existence, Rocky Glen Park was a park near Moosic, Pennsylvania. Founded by Arthur Frothingham in 1886 as a picnic park, it was transformed into an amusement park by engineer and entrepreneur Frederick Ingersoll in 1904. The trolley park was a popular Pennsylvania attraction that featured rides, arcades, and restaurants – even as a "wild west" theme park in the 1970s – until its closure in 1987.

History 

Land developer Arthur Frothingham purchased the site for $15 at a tax sale in 1885. The following year, Rocky Glenn was open to the public as a picnic park. About 1900, Frothingham contracted E. S. Williams to dam Dry Valley Run Creek to create a lake on the property; when Frothingham failed to pay Williams for the work, Williams sued and was awarded one-half interest in the park.

Soon afterward, Frothingham obtained a Pennsylvania state cemetery charter for the park after learning of plans of extending tracks of the Lehigh Valley Railroad over the grounds. To avoid losing the park via eminent domain, Frothingham interred two bodies (one of a man who died in a mining accident, one of a man who died in a train accident) in the proposed route of the track; the Lehigh Valley Railway purchased a parcel of the cemetery for $25,000 and agreed to build a Laurel Line station nearby.

In 1904, Frederick Ingersoll added amusement park rides and concessions, and the newly rechristened Rocky Glen Park, named after the newly formed Rocky Glen Water Company, became a local sensation. The following year saw the debut of Ingersoll's signature figure eight roller coaster as the Pittsburgh engineer started diverting his energies to his soon-to-open Luna Parks in Pittsburgh and Cleveland (his Luna Park in nearby Scranton was to open the following year). A rift between park owner Frothingham and park manager Ingersoll led to the parting of their ways in 1906.

Interest in the park waned in the 1910s, and Frothingham wished to sell his half of the property. After failed attempts to sell the park to MGM and Federal Feature Film Corporation of New York, Williams and Frothingham sold it to a trio of businessmen (John Nallin, Joe Jennings, and Ben Sterling) in 1919. After a tumultuous period in which the three partners disagreed about park management (at one point, Rocky Glen Park was divided in two by a fence), Sterling ultimately gained complete control in 1950 and renamed the park Sterling's Rocky Glen, the name he used for his half of the park when it was divided (eventually the name was shortened to Sterling's).

By 1945, Rocky Glen Park's popularity was on the upswing when Sterling added the Million Dollar Coaster, a 96-foot-tall, 4700-foot-long, out-and-back roller coaster that became the park's new signature attraction. Despite its name, the ride cost Sterling only $100,000 to build. Shoehorned between Glen Lake and the tracks of the Lackawanna and Wyoming Valley Railroad, it was one of the world's largest roller coasters at the time. It carried more than one million passengers in the first three years of its existence (it was dismantled in 1957).

The post-World War II increase in the use of the automobile contributed to the gradual decline in the use of the railroad, and the few remaining trolley parks were slowly fading into the sunset. Sterling's/Rocky Glen was no exception (its plight exacerbated by the decline in the coal industry at the same time), and by 1970, Ben Sterling opted to sell the park to an Atlanta, Georgia-based entertainment company, National Recreation Service.

The new owners promptly converted the grounds into a theme park, renaming it Ghost Town in the Glen (later Ghost Town Amusement Park) and gave it a western theme. The rebranding was not successful: the park changed hands once again in 1979 and became New Rocky Glen. The lake became a venue for concerts starting in 1980. The park closed for the last time in 1987.

Roller Coaster History
Rocky Glen was home to several large roller coasters in its history:
Figure 8 roller coaster (1904–1913) - Was built by Frederick Ingersoll in 1904 and opened August 6.  Owned by A.E. Todd, Ace Todd and Robert McCurtrie in 1913.  Removed when Ingersoll's original 10-year lease expired in 1913.
Mountain Dips Coaster (August 5, 1920 – December 1939) - Designed by John A. Miller and construction supervised by Herbert Schmeck, it was built in early 1920 by the Philadelphia Toboggan Company (Coaster #33) for $70,000 after Rocky Glen re-opened in the 1919 season under new ownership (Rocky Glen had been without rides from 1914 to 1919 since the original 10-year lease with Ingersoll expired in 1913 and had been in a state of flux). This coaster was built in front of the dam which also crossed over the Laurel Line railroad tracks and was considered the largest on the eastern seaboard in its early years.  The coaster was removed by December 1939 as the new Rocket ride was placed where the entrance to the coaster was for the 1940 season. Newspaper reports say Ben Sterling had torn down the coaster by December 1939 without any warning.  A death that occurred on the Coaster in September 1939 may have revealed safety concerns that Ben Sterling did not feel would be worth the cost or correcting, and merely elected to remove the ride instead.  It was unique in that the lift hill was actually halfway through the ride, instead of at the beginning.  The lift hill was structurally connected to the Laurel Line station's entrance overpass in its earlier design, but later was removed.  This coaster has been incorrectly referred to as the "Giant Coaster" due to generic advertisements of the time period, and is also confused in history with the Pippin Coaster as some have merged both coaster's histories together.  The Jack Rabbit at Kennywood Park in Pittsburgh, Pennsylvania has a similar design.
Pippin Coaster (May 24, 1924 – May 24, 1950) - was a part of the Nallin-Jennings Park Company and was built in 1924 for $70,000 by John A. Miller as the John A. Miller Company.  This coaster was the main attraction of the Nallin-Jennings side of Rocky Glen.  On May 24, 1950, a fire destroyed Ben Sterling's Penny Arcade, Nallin-Jennings's 3 major attractions: The massive Fun House (which was the rebuilt Crystal Dance Pavilion), Tokio Canal (an Old Mill type ride) and the front half of the Pippin Coaster. This fire, probably the most damaging of all fires in the park's history, all but ended the Nallin-Jennings side of Rocky Glen as they eventually sold the land and what was left to Benjamin & Lena Balka in December 1950, who then in turn immediately sold it to Ben & Mae Sterling in January 1951 who were the owners of the other half of the park. The Pippin's back half stood for several years (at least up until 1954) before finally being razed. Small parts of the coaster are buried in the ground and still visible as of 2023. A house now sits in its former path along Rocky Glen Rd, as the coaster actually went to the other side of the road.
Jazz Railway (1925–1927) Built by Harry G. Traver.  Only existed for 3 years.  It was situated on the top of the hill where the Million Dollar Coaster would be built.  The design is sometimes referred to as "Jazz Rail Road".
Sterling's "Million Dollar" Roller Coaster (May 25, 1946 – January 1958) -  Initially it was to be simply called "Sterling's Coaster" but advertisements stating, "Come ride Ben Sterling's 'Million Dollar' Roller Coaster," led to the widespread use of the "Million Dollar" moniker. It was built in late 1945 for only $100,000, intended as the replacement for the Mountain Dips Coaster, which had closed in 1939 and was dismantled. The designer was Vernon Keenan (coaster designer) of the National Amusement Devices Company of Ohio (originally known as the Dayton Fun House, it was also the source of the coaster cars). Because of the lumber shortage at the time of the construction—and a massive amount was needed for this coaster—pieces of this coaster were built from the Fernbrook Park Coaster, the "Wildcat" (1926-1945), which was located in Dallas, Pennsylvania. That coaster had closed in 1945, at the end of World War II. Sterling employed many union Seabees who were looking for work after their war service was over to build his coaster. Even though the Million Dollar Coaster had a very short life of 11 years, its size and thrills made it a legendary coaster of its time. Its initial drop was 96 feet high and approximately 3,700 feet long (Incorrectly reported to be 4,700 in some instances). Unfortunately, being close to the lake, ice and water had ruined and warped its supports over time and it was condemned in 1957. The Million Dollar coaster was dismantled in January and February 1958 and parts of it carted across the frozen Rocky Glen lake and used to build the next (and last) coaster, the Jet Coaster, for the 1959 season (Rocky Glen operated with no coasters in 1958).  In 1962, a brush fire destroyed the last remnants of the coaster (the beginning part of the lift hill and return track, which stood long after the main body was taken down around the water), which led to its final razing.  These last remaining pieces were behind the Dodgems building and mostly hidden from sight in the park.  This brush fire may have led to the belief that the entire coaster had burned in a fire, which was a long-standing, untrue rumor.  The Dodgems building eventually was extended and used the defunct coaster's tracks as support beams for this extension.
Jet / Mighty Lightnin' / "Comet" Coaster (May 3, 1959 – August 24, 1988) - Originally to be named the "Jet Age" and "Jet Star" Coaster, but later shortened to just the "Jet", it was designed by John C. Allen for the Philadelphia Toboggan Company (Coaster #126) and its construction supervised by Frank F. Hoover. It was built in late 1958 to replace Sterling's "Million Dollar" Coaster and when opened in 1959, it would be Rocky Glen's last major coaster. It was the staple of the later renamed Ghost Town in the Glen (later Ghost Town Park) and then New Rocky Glen. The lift hill was 55 feet high.  The coaster stood after the closing of the park in 1987 for several years until parts of it were destroyed by a fire. The removal of the turn of the century airplane ride tower actually came down through the coaster crushing it in one spot. The coaster was finally demolished in December 1994 and bulldozed into the ground. Pieces are visible on the grounds as of 2019 at the vacant land. A twin sister of the Jet coaster exists in Stricker's Grove in Ohio known as the "Tornado" that is the same design, but it is a reversed mirror image.  The father of both the Jet and the Tornado was the Montaña Rusa, located in Havana, Cuba as was the original design built in 1951.  The Comet name was never official, but used as a nickname in the last years of operation, to coincide with repainted cars and mural with a space theme.  This may have coincided with the return of Haley's Comet.  The Mighty Lightnin' sign remained on the coaster well after the park closed.  It had its last run at the Auction Day on August 24, 1988.
Monster Mouse (1982) was a steel wild mouse roller coaster, built next to the Jet Coaster.

Miniature Railroad
The Clifford Twp. Volunteer Fire Company in Susquehanna County, Pennsylvania is home to the 2nd miniature railroad that once existed at Rocky Glen Park.  The train is a National Amusement Device / Dayton Fun House ride bought through the John A. Miller Company and added to Rocky Glen back in 1924 as a part of the Nallin-Jennings Park's side of Rocky Glen as the park at the time was split into two. (John Nallin and Joseph Jennings were the owners, who bought the property from Frothingham in 1921.)  It operated in the same area the 1st Miniature Railroad did in 1904 with a slightly different path, which in the 1980s would be where the Jet Coaster was located. The railroad operated until the early 1950s, when Nallin-Jennings's side of Rocky Glen suffered the Fire of 1950, which destroyed Nallin-Jennings's 3 major rides including the Pippin Coaster, The Fun House (the remodeled Crystal Dance Pavilion) and the Tokio Canal water ride (an Old Mill type ride) along with Ben Sterling's Penny Arcade on May 24, 1950. With barely anything left but a few rides, what was left of Nallin-Jennings's side was sold to Benjamin & Lena Balka in December 1950, who in turn immediately sold it to Ben & Mae Sterling, who were the owners of the other half of the park in January 1951. Because Sterling now had control of the whole park, during the years of 1951 to 1954 they began removing the duplication of rides that existed on both sides of the park and, by 1954, finally tore down the back half of the Pippin Coaster which stood for 4 years. Sterling had his own Miniature Railroad (The 3rd one in the park's history) that went out along the "Million Dollar" Roller Coaster and was a much better attraction because of the proximity to the lake and large coaster. The now-former Nallin-Jennings Miniature Railroad was 'dismantled' and then sold by new owner Ben Sterling to persons from the Clifford Township Volunteer Fire Company, where it has remained with some modifications over the years to keep it going. As of 2023, it will be its 99th year in operation.

Interesting facts
There have been at least 42 recorded deaths that happened on the property since it became a destination in late 1903.  While most of these were drownings in the lake, there were also 4 roller coaster deaths, several persons electrocuted by the Laurel Line's third rail, and also a fatal airplane crash that ended up in the park with 3 people on board.
Rocky Glen never had a 'final day'.  The park fully intended to open for 1988, but disagreements with the lease agreement between Park Manager Marvin Roth and Park landowner Gabe Warshawsky caused it to not open for 1988.
Contrary to popular belief, the famed Swiss Cottage was not the oldest building in the park.  That title belonged to what would eventually be the Golden Nugget Casino by the 1980s.  This circular building was originally the carousel house built in 1904 and went through different modifications and uses until it burned in the 1990s.
"Rocky Glen" as a name was first organized on February 11, 1901, where Arthur Frothingham along with his niece Annette Reynolds officially formed the Rocky Glen Water Company.  The original plan was to build a dam to create a reservoir to provide water to the Lower Lackawanna Valley.  This "public utility" was used as the main weapon against the Laurel Line from using eminent domain to take the land since a utility company would be exempt.  After several lawsuits, they finally came to a mutual agreement in 1902.  Coincidentally, Laura Frothingham's Letters of Patent on the land in 1886 was also filed on February 11, essentially making the date of February 11 Rocky Glen's "Birthday".
Ethnic Days did not begin at Rocky Glen, but they continued a tradition where local parks in the area once held them yearly.  Park Manager Anthony "AJ" Duffy, who previously managed the Scranton Luna Park, continued this tradition when he took over management of Rocky Glen in 1919.
Ben Sterling had inquired into the possibility of the park continuing as a State Park in the late 1960s.  His intention was to let the state take over the park so it could continue on into the future for the people of the valley.  Unfortunately, the state would require the park to be sold off as they would not run rides or stands but use the lands only.  Sterling would later opt to sell to National Recreation Service (Ghost Town in the Glen) in hopes that corporate money would be the way to keep it going on.  Just 15 years after his death in 1973, the park would be gone.

After the closure

The local congregation of Hare Krishna attempted to purchase the Rocky Glen Park grounds so it could erect a walled "City of God" on the site. Seven hundred residents signed petitions protesting the proposed sale, which fell through as a result.
In 1988, the park's 1903 vintage Parker carousel was sold in auction for $220,000 as the park's facilities were being dismantled.  It is important to note that Rocky Glen had several carousels over the years, and not one long-lasting carousel.
 The Antique Cars were sold to Knoebels Amusement Resort at the auction in 1988, while the Bumper Boats were previously purchased in 1982.  While the Antique Cars are still running, the Bumper Boats were removed in 2015 to make way for the new steel coaster, Impulse.  Most of the original cars have been cycled out for newer cars, which was confirmed by Knoebel's personnel.

References

External links

Amusement parks in Pennsylvania
1987 disestablishments in Pennsylvania
Defunct amusement parks in Pennsylvania
1950 fires in the United States
Amusement parks closed in 1987
1950 in Pennsylvania